
PDN may refer to:

Digital 
 PDN Gateway (Packet Data Network Gateway), 
 PDN Mail, electronic messaging developed by Prime Computer
 Public data network

File extension  
 Portable Draughts Notation (.PDN), the standard computer format for recording draughts games
 .PDN, the native format for the graphics editing program Paint.NET

Publication 
 Pacific Daily News, a newspaper based on Guam
 Photo District News, an American monthly trade publication for photographers
 Product discontinuance notice, indication of the end of production, especially for electronic components

Entity 
 Department of Physiology, Development and Neuroscience, University of Cambridge
 National Democratic Party (Argentina)

Other 
 ISO 639:pdn or Podena language, spoken in Indonesia
 Phenotypic disease network (PDN)
 PDN Impedance (Power delivery network impedance)